The Umbrella Cover Museum in Peaks Island, Maine is a museum that pays tribute to umbrella covers. The museum was created and is curated by Nancy 3.  Hoffman, who has collected more than 2000 umbrella covers from 66 countries as of July 2018.

The mission of the Umbrella Cover Museums states that it is "dedicated to the appreciation of the mundane in everyday life. It is about finding wonder and beauty in the simplest of things, and about knowing that there is always a story behind the cover."

The idea for the museum came when Hoffman was cleaning out a closet and came across seven umbrella covers. The museum began in Hoffman's kitchen and was moved to a larger location as the collection grew. The museum's collection ranges in size from a  two-and-a-half-inch Barbie doll cover to a six-foot patio umbrella sleeve. It has hosted special exhibitions including “People and Their Covers” and “New Umbrella Cover Fashions.”

On 7 July 2012, Guinness World Records named Hoffman's umbrella cover collection of 730 at the time to be the largest in the world.

The museum is closed during the winter. Guided tours include Hoffman, who is also a musician, singing "Let a Smile Be Your Umbrella" while playing an accordion.

References

External links
Umbrella Cover Museum

 

Museums in Portland, Maine
Fashion accessories
Fashion museums in the United States
Peaks Island, Maine